Kiragoorina Gayyaligalu ) is a 2016 Indian Kannada-language drama film directed by Sumana Kittur,  based on a novel of the same name written by Poornachandra Tejaswi. It stars Shwetha Srivatsav, Sukrutha Wagle, Karunya Ram, Sonu, and Manasa Joshi in the lead roles. The supporting cast features Achyuth Kumar, Kishore, Sharath Lohitashwa

Cast

Production

Development
Sumana Kittur, an admirer of writer Poornachandra Tejaswi's works, said his work Kiragoorina Gayyaligalu stood out for her, as it was set in a village backdrop, that she associated to, having had the same origins. She approached Rajeswari Tejaswi, Poornachandra Tejaswi's wife, for the copyrights to adapt the novella into a film. Following this, she announced of the film in January 2015.

Casting

Kittur announced that the lead role of Daanamma would be played by Shwetha Srivatsav, and that Achyuth Kumar would appear in a pivotal role. It was revealed in March 2015 that Sukrutha Wagle, Sonu, Kishore and Manasa Joshi would play other lead. Sharath Lohitashwa would play supporting roles, and that Yogesh would appear in an important role in the film. On casting Srivatsav in the lead role, she said, "She has not been exposed to too many films. So, I thought that she would appear fresh in this particular role. Also, she had already read the novel, when I approached her and all she asked me was whether she would be playing the character of Daanamma". The casting of Karunya Ram and Manasa Joshi were confirmed in April 2015. Writer Agni Shridhar, who had previously collaborated with Kittur in Edegarike (2012), was chosen to work on the film's screenplay and dialogues. Speaking on the subject of the film, Kittur said the film was "heroine-oriented" and that it would "depict the lives of girls in villages." Speaking to The Indian Express during its post-production stages, Shridhar said, "[T]he film is a mirror of the women folk of any village in India but does not talk about feminism, neither in the story nor through the characters. But the feminist theme Sumana has portrayed would be the answer to the people in all fields, including politics".

Filming
Pre-production work of the film began in April 2015. Reports said, prior to the beginning of filming, in preparation for her role, Srivatsav took to villages in Karnataka to get a hold of the village dialect and understand the way of living. To resemble the village with environs of Kiragooru as depicted by Tejaswi in his novella, the makers scouted over 50 villages in areas surrounding and in Bangalore and Mysore in Karnataka before zeroing on three villages in Kanakapura of Ramanagara district — Doddabadkere, Goluru and Chikkanawalase — villages close to Bangalore, making the team easier to traverse between them and the latter. Significant portions were also shot in Harohalli in Mysore district.

Soundtrack

References

External links
 

2016 films
Films based on Indian novels
2010s Kannada-language films
Films directed by Sumana Kittur